Ghanshyampur may refer to:

Ghanshyampur (Vidhan Sabha constituency) in Darbhanga district, Bihar,  India
Ghanshyampur, a village in Kalna I block of Purba Bardhaman district, West Bengal, India
Ghanashyampur, a village of South 24 Parganas, West Bengal, India